Lachnocnema ducarmei is a butterfly in the family Lycaenidae. It is found in the north-eastern part of the Democratic Republic of the Congo.

References

Butterflies described in 1996
Taxa named by Michel Libert
Miletinae
Endemic fauna of the Democratic Republic of the Congo